Önder Sav (born December 1937 in Manyas, Balıkesir) is a Turkish politician. He is of Circassian origin. He graduated from Ankara University Law School. He has been in politics since the 1950s. He is currently a member of CHP and the Turkish Parliament. In March 2003, he was against Turkish collaboration at the Iraq War, and he called American ships as "enemy ships".

He was President of the Turkish Bar Association from 1989 to 1995.

References

Living people
People from Manyas
1937 births
20th-century Turkish lawyers
Contemporary Republican People's Party (Turkey) politicians
Turkish people of Circassian descent
Deputies of Ankara
Members of the 23rd Parliament of Turkey
Members of the 22nd Parliament of Turkey
Members of the 20th Parliament of Turkey